Three ships of the Royal Navy have borne the name HMS Tower:

  was a 4-gun smack purchased in 1668 and sold in 1674.
  was a 6-gun tender launched in 1809, lent to the Thames Police in 1817 and sold in 1825.
  was a modified  launched in 1917 and sold in 1928.

Royal Navy ship names